Her Own Free Will is a 1924 American silent drama film directed by Paul Scardon and starring Helene Chadwick, Holmes Herbert, and Violet Mersereau. It was based on a novel of the same name by the British writer Ethel M. Dell.

Cast
 Helene Chadwick as Nan Everard 
 Holmes Herbert as Peter Craddock 
 Allan Simpson as Jerry Lister 
 George Backus as Col. Everard 
 Violet Mersereau as Mona Everard

Preservation
With no copies of Her Own Free Will located in any film archives, it is a lost film.

References

Bibliography
 Goble, Alan. The Complete Index to Literary Sources in Film. Walter de Gruyter, 1999.

External links

1924 films
1924 drama films
1920s English-language films
American silent feature films
Silent American drama films
Films directed by Paul Scardon
American black-and-white films
Producers Distributing Corporation films
1920s American films